Polythore is a genus of damselflies in the family Polythoridae. There are about 19 described species in Polythore.

Species
These 19 species belong to the genus Polythore:

 Polythore aurora (Selys, 1879) i c g
 Polythore batesi (Selys, 1869) i c g
 Polythore beata (McLachlan, 1869) i c g
 Polythore boliviana (McLachlan, 1878) i c g
 Polythore concinna (McLachlan, 1881) i c g
 Polythore derivata (McLachlan, 1881) i c g
 Polythore gigantea (Selys, 1853) i c g
 Polythore lamerceda Bick and Bick, 1985 i c g
 Polythore manua Bick and Bick, 1990 i c g
 Polythore mutata (McLachlan, 1881) i c g
 Polythore neopicta Bick and Bick, 1990 i c g
 Polythore ornata (Selys, 1879) i c g
 Polythore picta (Rambur, 1842) i c g
 Polythore procera (Selys, 1869) i c g
 Polythore spaeteri Burmeister and Börzsöny, 2003 i c g
 Polythore terminata Fraser, 1946 i c g
 Polythore victoria (McLachlan, 1869) i c g
 Polythore vittata (Selys, 1869) i c g
 Polythore williamsoni (Förster, 1903) i c g

Data sources: i = ITIS, c = Catalogue of Life, g = GBIF, b = Bugguide.net

References

Further reading

 
 
 
 
 
 
 

Damselflies